() is a town located in Aomori Prefecture, Japan and a part of the Aomori metropolitan area. , the town had an estimated population of 10,460 in 4,860 households, and a population density of 48 persons per km². It is the most heavily populated town in Higashitsugaru District.

Etymology
The name Hiranai is thought to have originated from the Ainu who originally inhabited the area. However, the current Japanese pronunciation and meaning of the town's name,  is descriptive of the valley, but is based on the flat area inside of the mountains or the bay that surrounds it.

History
During the Edo period, Hiranai was a village. On 17 September 1656, the village became part of Kuroishi Domain controlled by the Tsugaru clan. Up to the middle of the Edo period, the isolated areas of Hiranai were some of the last sanctuaries for the Ainu people in Honshu. However, they were assimilated into the rest of the population by pushes made by the ruling Tsugaru clan in 1756 and 1809. In July 1871, with the abolition of the han system, Kuroishi Domain briefly became Kuroishi Prefecture, and was merged into the newly created Aomori Prefecture in September 1871. During the cadastral reform of 1889, Natsudomari Peninsula was divided into the three villages of Naka-Hiranai, Nishi-Hiranai, and Higashi-Hiranai. On 1 October 1928, Naka-Hiranai became a town, renaming itself Kominato.

1939 to present
Nishi-Hiranai village's train station, Nishi-Hiranai Station opened in 1939. The station was built to provide access to the Aomori Sanatorium, a facility to treat the soldiers who were injured during the Second Sino-Japanese War and later, the Pacific War. The climate of Natsudomari Peninsula and the proximity to Asamushi Onsen was of benefit to the wounded soldiers. After the end of hostilities, the sanatorium was closed.

On 15 July 1945, four seaplanes of the Imperial Japanese Army's Giretsu Kuteitai docked off the east coast of Natsudomari Peninsula were bombed. Off the northern coast of the peninsula a ship was sunk, killing 3 and leaving 9 injured.

On the 9th and 10 August of the same year Grumman TBF Avengers bombed the entirety of the town and a troop transport ship, the Hanasaki Maru, was sunk. One person was wounded.

On 31 March 1955, Kominato merged with Nishi-Hiranai and Higashi-Hiranai to form the town, Hiranai. On 20 May  1963, Emperor Shōwa and Empress Kōjun visited Hiranai to plant a Japanese red pine in the Yogoshiyama Forest Park for the 14th Annual Tree Planting Event and National Greening Convention.

In 2012, Hiranai won a competition amongst towns and cities in Aomori Prefecture for who could produce the best advertisement film for their town. The film was titled,  as a play on the pronunciation of the town's name and that the town isn't well known. The commercial features a child looking for the town, Shiranai, but nobody knows where that is. She then is told that she is probably looking for Hiranai and that it's not a town that nobody knows. This phrase from the film is well known by the town's citizens.

Demographics
Per Japanese census data, the population of Hiranai has decreased by 38% over the past 50 years.

Geography

Hiranai occupies the Natsudomari Peninsula, the northern end of the Ōu Mountain Range that juts into central Mutsu Bay. The town's population is concentrated near the Japan National Route 4 passing through the east and west of the town and the Aoimori Railway Line (formerly the Tōhoku Main Line). The town office is in the settlement of Kominato, the central part of Hiranai centered around the valley of the Kominato River. The Kominato River begins in the mountains in the south of Hiranai, and flows north through the mountains until it reaches the flat land the town is situated on. After passing through Kominato, it joins the Morita River, which empties into Mutsu Bay shortly after their confluence. The southern part of Hiranai is mainly mountainous. The edges of the town make up the bulk of the Asamushi-Natsudomari Prefectural Natural Park.

Climate
The town has a cold humid continental climate (Köppen Cfb) characterized by warm short summers and long cold winters with heavy snowfall. The average annual temperature in Hiranai is 9.8 °C. The average annual rainfall is 1262 mm with September as the wettest month. The temperatures are highest on average in August, at around 22.8 °C, and lowest in January, at around -2.0 °C.

Neighboring municipalities
Aomori Prefecture
Aomori
Noheji
Tōhoku
Shichinohe

Government
Hiranai has a mayor-council form of government with a directly elected mayor and a unicameral town council of 12 members. In terms of national politics, the town is represented in the Diet of Japan's House of Representatives as a part of the Aomori 1st district.

Economy
The economy of Hiranai is heavily dependent on commercial fishing. Some of the locally caught seafood include sea urchin roe, sea cucumber, scallops, abalone and squid. Tourism also plays a role in the economy, with beaches in close proximity to the city of Aomori in summer, ski resorts in winter, and onsen all year drawing tourists.

Education
Hiranai has three public elementary schools and three public middle schools operated by the town government. Hiranai formerly had one public high school, the Hiranai branch of Aomori-Higashi High School, operated by the Aomori Prefectural Board of Education, but it was closed in 2021. Following the high school's closure it was designated as a public venue for the deployment of COVID-19 vaccines beginning in April 2021.

The town is also home to Shofujuku High School, a privately-run school established in 1974 that follows a curriculum based on the beliefs of Shōroku Shintō Yamatoyama. The private school gained national attention for its use of the deprecated Imperial Rescript on Education in its curriculum.

Transportation

Railway
 Aoimori Railway Company - Aoimori Railway Line
 -  -  -

Highway

  (unsigned)
Aomori Prefecture Route 9
Aomori Prefecture Route 123
Aomori Prefecture Route 206
Aomori Prefecture Route 207
Aomori Prefecture Route 209
Aomori Prefecture Route 210
Aomori Prefecture Route 215
Aomori Prefecture Route 269

Bus
Shimokita Kōtsū
Kōnan Bus Company (seasonal)
Aomori City Bus (transferred services to Shimokita Kōtsū in 2004)

Local attractions
Yogoshiyama Forest Park is run by the town featuring multiple attractions, with more than 3,000 kinds of succulent plants grouped in a large greenhouse of 990 square meters from different parts of the world, including the Americas and Africa. Cacti and flowers of tropical origin bloom year-round. The park also has ski and snowboarding facilities, including a ski lift.
Asadokoro  is the only designated natural monument in Japan for the observation of swans. Tundra swan from Siberia come to the region during the winter. A local legend says that the Tsugaru clan was at risk of losing what would become Hiranai to the Nanbu clan. After the Tsugaru forces prayed for help against the Nanbu, a massive flock of swans appeared. The Nanbu couldn't see the swans, but they mistook their honking for the sound of arriving Tsugaru reinforcements. The Nanbu retreated, preserving the border between the Tsugaru's Kuroishi Domain and the Nanbu's Shichinohe Domain. Hiranai maintains a counter for the amount of swans staying in the area during the winter.

Notable people from Hiranai
Takahashi Chikuzan - professional Tsugaru-jamisen musician
Toru Hosokawa - professional baseball player for the Chiba Lotte Marines
 Shinkishi Hatai - Biologist

References

External links
 

Towns in Aomori Prefecture
Populated coastal places in Japan
Hiranai, Aomori
Aomori metropolitan area